The High Commissioner of Australia to Tuvalu is an officer of the Australian Department of Foreign Affairs and Trade and the head of the High Commission of the Commonwealth of Australia in Tuvalu. The position has the rank and status of an Ambassador Extraordinary and Plenipotentiary and the high commissioner resides in Funafuti. The high commissioner since October 2021 is Robin McKenzie. There has been a resident Australian High Commissioner in Tuvalu since October 2018, and the Australian High Commission is one of only two resident diplomatic missions in Tuvalu, the other being the Embassy of Taiwan

Posting history
Prior to the independence of Tuvalu on 1 October 1978, the High Commission in Suva was accredited to Tuvalu, with the high commissioner (1977–2014) and deputy high commissioner (2014–2018) serving as the non-resident accredited high commissioner to Tuvalu. In the 2018 Australian Federal budget, funding was allocated to establish a High Commission in Tuvalu, becoming one of only two diplomatic missions in Tuvalu (the other being the Embassy of Taiwan). A resident High Commissioner to Tuvalu was appointed in 2018, and the High Commission was officially opened in 2019.

Heads of mission

See also
 Australia–Tuvalu relations
 Foreign relations of Tuvalu
 Foreign relations of Australia

References

External links

Australian High Commission, Funafuti

 
Tuvalu
Australia